Brandon Village Historic District may refer to:

Brandon Village (Brandon, South Dakota), a historic district listed on the NRHP in South Dakota
Brandon Village Historic District (Brandon, Vermont), listed on the NRHP in Vermont
Brandon Village Hall and Library, Brandon, Wisconsin, listed on the NRHP in Wisconsin